The fourth season of Indian talent competition programme India's Got Talent was broadcast on Colors TV, from 22 September to 24 November 2012. The show was hosted by Manish Paul & Cyrus Sahukar & judges by Veteran Kirron Kher, Karan Johar & Malaika Arora Khan during the auditions but later in the Semi-Finals Malaika was replaced by Farah Khan for rest of the season.

The fourth season was won by Biwash Academy of Dance winning a cash prize of Rs. 50,00,000.

Format

Auditions 
Each participant that seeks to enter that year's competition must first submit an application to the programme, containing information about who is performing – whether a single person, a pair or trio of performers, or a small or large group – personal details regarding age, hometown, and background, what experience they have for their talent, and the nature of the act that will be performed. Eligibility for the contest is determined by what information is submitted for researchers to double-check – such information is required, per the programme's terms and conditions. Once an application is approved, the participant conducts a performance during an open audition close to where they reside (or can reach), whereupon if successful, they will be allocated a place in the second round, and at a venue that they can reach without issue. Once they arrive at the venue they are assigned to, the participant is then given a number, and remains within the venue's designated waiting area until called into the wings to prepare to perform. Once brought onto the main stage, they begin by engaging with the judges, asking a few small questions – subjects can include their name, background, and nature of their performance – whereupon they are given three minutes to conduct their performance; a backing track for their act is allowed if required.

A performance ends when either the time is up, or all the judges use their buzzers – each judge has one that they can use to signal their dislike of the performance if they believe it to be unconvincing, boring, or completely unacceptable for the contest, though a buzzer can be retracted if the judge felt they used it mistakenly, such as if the participant's performance did something unexpected that changed their opinion of them. Once a performance is over, each judge will give an overview of what they thought about the act, before casting a vote. If the contestant(s) receives a majority vote of "Yes", they then proceed onto the next stage in the contest, otherwise they are eliminated at that point from the competition.

Filming for each series begins during the Judges' Auditions, and always consists of recording taken from each venue of auditions and backstage scenes within the wings and waiting area. Footage taken by production staff is then edited into a series of episodes consisting of montages of scenes from multiple venues, consisting of the most notable auditions – the best, worst, and funniest made – along with interviews with some of the notable participants that auditioned, and recorded backstage scenes of the hosts overseeing the performances from the wings.

Judge Cuts 
This stage takes place after the auditions have been completed, and is also referred to as Deliberation Day, in which the judges look through the acts that have successfully made it to this stage, and begin whittling them down to those who would stand a fair chance in the semi-finals. The amount that goes through has varied over the show's history, though usually consists of a number that can be divided equally over the semi-finals being held in a series. Once the judges have decided on who will go through, all contestants that have reached this stage are called back to discover if they will progress into the live semi-finals or not. After this has been done, the acts are divided up between the semi-finals that the series will have.

Semi Finals and Final 
Contestants who make it into the semi-finals by passing both stages of auditions, are divided into groups for each round, where they must perform before the audience and judges. As with the audition stage, each semi-finalist must conduct a performance before the judges – a new routine of their act – with the judges' role being to watch what is conducted and give feedback towards the end of the performance; buzzers may still be used by each judge, and the performance can be ultimately terminated if all buzzers are used.

Each semi-final can only have two participants advance into the final, and these are determined by two votes. The first is public phone-in vote – that takes place once all semi-finalists have performed and during a break in the semi-final to allow for votes to be made. Once the vote period is ended and the results counted and fully verified, the semi-finalist with the highest total of votes is announced as the winner of the semi-final and secures their place in the final. The second vote involves the judges and takes place after the result, in which they vote between the two semi-finalists placed 2nd and 3rd respectively in the public vote, with the participant receiving the majority vote securing their place in the finals. In addition to these votes, semi-finalists can also secure a place in the finals if chosen as a "Wildcard", the format allows the judges to choose any eliminated semi-finalist to be appointed as their Wildcard in the finals, through a private vote conducted once the semi-finals are completed; the result of this vote is announced prior to the final's broadcast.

The finals operate in a similar manner to the semi-finals, though all participants in this stage compete primarily to win votes from the public with a new routine; the judges can still buzz and give opinions on the performance they view, but have little impact on the public's voting intention. Once the public vote has been completed, once all finalists have performed, and the votes verified and counted, the hosts announce the winner who received the most votes from the public. The winner received a cash prize of ₹50,00,000 (₹ 50 Lakh  or $5 Million) and Alto 800 car!

Season Overview 
Of the participants that took part, only forty made it past this stage and into the six semi-finals, with 5,6 or 7 appearing in each one, and thirteen of these acts making it into the live final; the wildcard act chosen by the judges was dance group Ocean Kids''', after he lost out in the Judges' vote in the first semi-final. The following below lists the results of each participant's overall performance in this series:

  |  |  | 
  |  Judges' Wildcard Finalist

 Semi Finals Summary 

  Buzzed |  Judges' Vote |''' 
  |  |

Semi Final 1 (21 October) 
Special Guest- Preity Zinta

Semi Final 2 (27 October) 
Special Guest- Sonakshi Sinha

Semi Final 3 (28 October) 
Special Guest- Yuvraj Singh

Semi Final 4 (3 November)

Semi Final 5 (4 November)

Semi Final 6 (10 November)

Grand Finale (18 November) 
 |  | 

Guests: Jab Tak Hai Jaan Cast (Shah Rukh Khan, Anushka Sharma, Katrina Kaif) 
Judge: Malaika Arora Khan (Old Judge of the Season)

References 

Indian television series
Got Talent
2012 Indian television seasons
Sony Entertainment Television